Joseph Massie (died 1784) was an 18th-century political economist who wrote about 15 pamphlets dealing with economic and financial questions. Although he was probably less important than writers such as James Denham-Steuart or Josiah Tucker, he contributed to the birth of political economy before Adam Smith.

Like most of the political economists writing in the 18th century (and in opposition to those writing in the 17th century), he was not engaged in economic activity. He was indeed a writer and antiquarian, owning more than 1,500 economic treatises, extending from 1557 to 1763. He used this collection, together with contemporary trade statistics, to write some 15 pamphlets on various questions such as urbanism, commerce, finances (and especially the problem of the public debt during the Seven Years' War.)

References
For 18th-century economical writers before Adam Smith: "Managing the Great Machine of Trade", in Nancy F. Koehn, The Power of Commerce, London and Ithaca: Cornell University Press, 1994.
Access to the list of Massie's pamphlets is at the English Short Title Catalogue of the British Library.

External links
 

1784 deaths
British economists
English economists
Year of birth unknown